Poland competed at the 1988 Winter Paralympics in Innsbruck, Austria. 13 competitors from Poland won 8 medals and finished 12th in the medal table.

Medalists

Gold
 Marcin Kos - Cross-country skiing, Standing 15 km Individual Free LW5/7

Silver
 Marcin Kos - Cross-country skiing, Standing 5 km Individual Classic LW5/7

Bronze
 Elżbieta Dadok - Alpine skiing, Slalom LW6/8
 Elżbieta Dadok - Alpine skiing, Giant slalom LW6/8
 Franciszek Tracz - Alpine skiing, Downhill LW3
 Jan Kołodziej - Cross-country skiing, Standing 5 km Individual Classic LW3/9
 Jan Kołodziej - Cross-country skiing, Standing 10 km Individual Free LW3/9
 Jerzy Szlezak - Cross-country skiing, Standing 15 km Individual Free LW5/7

Alpine skiing

Biathlon

Cross‑country skiing

See also 
 Poland at the Paralympics
 Poland at the 1988 Winter Olympics

References 

Poland at the Paralympics
1988 in Polish sport
Nations at the 1988 Winter Paralympics